Sir Thomas Boor Crosby, FRCS (1830 – 7 April 1916) was a British doctor who was the Lord Mayor of London from 1911 to 1912, having served as Sheriff of the City of London from 1906 to 1907. He was knighted in 1907.

References 

 https://www.ukwhoswho.com/view/10.1093/ww/9780199540891.001.0001/ww-9780199540884-e-195214?rskey=d1ZkDP&result=1

English surgeons
Fellows of the Royal College of Surgeons
20th-century lord mayors of London
1830 births
1916 deaths
Sheriffs of the City of London
English knights
Place of birth missing